Alpha Epsilon is a scholastic honor society recognizing academic achievement among students in the fields of Agricultural, Food, and Biological Engineering.

History
Alpha Epsilon Honor Society was founded at the University of Missouri on May 14, 1959, to recognize academic achievement among students in the field of Agricultural Engineering.  It began steady expansion immediately, adding chapters at the University of Illinois, University of Minnesota, University of Arkansas, Purdue University and Virginia Tech.

The first six chapters met to formally adopt a national constitution and bylaws four years after its founding, on December 11, 1963.

While the Society's initial focus was Agricultural Engineering, this was later expanded to include Food Engineering, and Biological Engineering.

Alpha Epsilon was admitted to the Association of College Honor Societies in 1968, with full membership achieved in 1970.

The Society meets annually, in conjunction with the American Society of Agricultural and Biological Engineers (ASABE). The two organizations cooperate but are managed by two separate executive boards. They share a website and physical mailing address.

Alpha Epsilon honor society has 30 active chapters across the United States, and a total membership of around 8,000.

Membership is offered to those juniors who are in the upper quarter of their class, and seniors in the upper third. Prospective members must already be members of the ASABE. Both undergraduate and graduate students are eligible for collegiate membership. The society allows for three types of members: Honorary, Active, and Alumni.

Traditions
The purpose of the society, as set forth in 1959 is:
To promote the high ideals of the engineering profession, to give recognition to those agricultural engineers who manifest worthy qualities of character, scholarship, and professional attainment, and to encourage and support such improvements in the agricultural engineering profession to make it an instrument of greater service to mankind. 

Chapters are fairly autonomous, allowed to manage their own activity broadly. One commonality that is shared by many groups is the provision of tutoring services to students in the Agricultural sciences.

The motto of the Society is not made public.

There is no official publication; member news is distributed via email or as postal letters.

The colors of the society are black and gold.

The badge of the society is a key, etched in back with the name of the owner, the name of the chapter and the year of the member's initiation.

Alpha Epsilon's crest is in the form of a shield with a banner displaying the name of the society, "Alpha Epsilon," . The shield is further decorated with three symbols, the Horn of Plenty, a plow, and a T-square and compass. These symbols represent the place of agricultural engineering in the production of food and fiber.

Chapters
This is a list of Alpha Epsilon chapters. Chapter names, dates and schools taken from Baird's Manual, 20th Ed., the Alpha Epsilon national website or the Alpha Epsilon master member list.

External links
 
  ACHS Alpha Epsilon entry
  Alpha Epsilon chapter list at ACHS

See also
 Association of College Honor Societies

References

Association of College Honor Societies
Honor societies
University of Missouri
Student organizations established in 1959
1959 establishments in Missouri